Kusumia is a genus of beetles in the family Carabidae, containing the following species:

 Kusumia amicorum Ueno, 1999
 Kusumia australis Ueno, 1999
 Kusumia crocodilus Ueno, 2005
 Kusumia dentata Ueno, 1999
 Kusumia elongata Ueno, 1999
 Kusumia fusipennis Ueno & Nishikawa, 2001
 Kusumia gelida Ueno & Naito, 2003
 Kusumia hatenashiana Ueno, 2002
 Kusumia insperata Ueno, 2005
 Kusumia kitayamai Ashida, 2000
 Kusumia laticollis Ueno, 1999
 Kusumia latior Ueno, 1999
 Kusumia longicollis Ueno, 1999
 Kusumia militis Ueno & Naito, 2005
 Kusumia obaco Ueno & Naito, 2005
 Kusumia rotundata Ueno & Naito, 2005
 Kusumia septentrionalis Ueno, 2002
 Kusumia takahasii Ueno, 1952
 Kusumia tanakai Ueno, 1999
 Kusumia variabilis Ueno & Naito, 2005
 Kusumia yoshikawai Ueno, 1960
 Kusumia yosiiana Ueno, 1960

References

Trechinae